José Luis Abilleira (born 27 October 1947) is a Spanish racing cyclist. He rode in the 1973 Tour de France.

References

External links
 

1947 births
Living people
Spanish male cyclists
Cyclists from Madrid